The 1992 Open Championship was a men's major golf championship and the 121st Open Championship, held from 16–19 July at Muirfield Golf Links in Gullane, Scotland. Nick Faldo won his third Open Championship and fifth major title by one stroke over runner-up John Cook. It was Faldo's second win at Muirfield, where he won his first Claret Jug in 1987. Daren Lee of England was the only amateur to make the cut; he earned the silver medal as low amateur and finished in a tie for 68th place.

Course

Source:

Lengths of the course for previous Opens (since 1950):

 1987: , par 71  
 1980: , par 71
 1972: , par 71

 1966: , par 71   
 1959: , par 72

Past champions in the field

Made the cut

Missed the cut

Round summaries

First round
Thursday, 16 July 1992

Second round
Friday, 17 July 1992

Amateurs: Lee (-2), Pullan (+3), Voges (+8), Welch (+8), Wolstenholme (+11).

Third round
Saturday, 18 July 1992

Final round
Sunday, 19 July 1992

Source:

Amateurs: Lee (+9)

Scorecard
Final round

Cumulative tournament scores, relative to par
Source:

References

External links
Muirfield 1992 (Official site)
121st Open Championship - Muirfield (European Tour)

The Open Championship
Golf tournaments in Scotland
Open Championship
Open Championship
Open Championship